Eric Schopler (February 8, 1927 – July 7, 2006) was a German born American psychologist whose pioneering research into autism led to the foundation of the TEACCH program.

Personal life
Eric Schopler was born February 8, 1927, in Fürth, Germany to Erna Oppenheimer Schopler and Ernst Schopler, who were Jewish. In 1938 his family fled Nazi Germany and emigrated to the U.S., where they settled in Rochester, New York.

Schopler married Betsy Burch in 1953 and together they had three children: Bobby, Tom and Susie. Following his divorce in 1970, he married Margaret Lansing. He died at the age of 79 from cancer on July 7, 2006, at his home near Mebane, North Carolina.

Military service and education
After graduating from high school, Schopler joined the United States Army. In 1949 Schopler earned his bachelor's degree from the University of Chicago. In 1955, he attained a graduate degree in Social Service Administration. He earned a PhD in clinical child psychology in 1964. All three degrees were attained at the University of Chicago.

Career

Early career
After attaining his graduate degree, Schopler worked from 1955 to 1958 as a family counselor in Rochester, New York. He moved to Rhode Island where for 2 years he worked at the Emma P. Bradley Hospital as the Acting Chief Psychiatric Social
Worker. Then in 1960 worked in Chicago at the Treatment and Research Center for Childhood Schizophrenia. He was an investigator and therapist there until 1964, the same year that he attained his doctorate from University of Chicago.

University of North Carolina
Schopler joined the faculty as an associate professor of the Psychiatry department at the University of North Carolina at Chapel Hill in 1964. He became the director of the Child Research Project in 1966. In collaboration with Dr. Robert Reichler, he applied his earlier research on receptor processes to the treatment of autism. Funding was provided by the National Institute of Mental Health and trials were conducted with autistic children and their parents.

As a result of his work for the Child Research Project, the Treatment and Education of Autistic and Related Communication Handicapped Children (TEACCH) was created in 1971 and he was made co-director in 1972. It is a "pioneering" program for assisting with autism spectrum disorder education, research and service delivery for children and adults. The TEACCH program lead to many advances in knowledge of autism. Schopler showed that most autistic children did not have mental disorders, as was believed by many at the time. He also proved that parents of autistic children could be effective collaborators in the treatment and education of their children. Thanks to these TEACCH results, in 1972 Schopler's methods were rolled out statewide in North Carolina schools and special state-funded clinics.

The following year he was made a professor. In 1976 he became the director or TEACCH and remained so until 1993. He became the Associate Chair for Developmental Disabilities in 1992, which he held until 1996. Overlapping his time as Director of TEACCH and as Associate Chair for Developmental Disabilities, Schopler was the Chief Psychologist from 1987 to 1999. He worked at the University of North Carolina's TEACCH program until 2005.

The TEACCH methodology has been implemented internationally and, as of 2006, in North Carolina there were 9 TEACCH state funded clinics in operation.

Other professional activities
Schopler was editor for Journal of Autism and Developmental Disorders from 1974 until 1997. His successor was Gary B. Mesibov. He was also on the Schizophrenia Bulletin and the Topics in Early Childhood Special Education editorial boards.

He was a member of the Society for Research in Child Development, American Association on Mental Deficiency, and American Association for the Advancement of Science. He also served on the advisory boards of Autism Society of America, Autism Society of North Carolina, Linwood Children's Center (Ellicott City, Maryland) and Bitter Sweet Farms (Toledo, Ohio).

Recognition
He received the following recognition for his work: 
1972 - American Psychiatric Association's Gold Achievement Award for Child Research Project
1985 - University of North Carolina at Chapel Hill's O. Max Gardner Award for contributions to human welfare
1993 - North Carolina Award for public service
1997 - American Psychological Association's Award for Distinguished Contributions to the Advancement of Knowledge and Service
2005 - Autism Society of North Carolina's Lifetime Achievement Award
2006 - American Psychological Foundation's Gold Medal for Life Achievement in the Application of Psychology
2007 - North Carolina General Assembly Joint Resolution honoring the life and memory of Eric Scholper, "a pioneer in the treatment of autism

Publications
More than 200 articles and books were written by Scholper on autism spectrum disorders. This is a partial list of some of the books he's written.

Eric Schopler; Robert J. Reichler. (editors). Psychopathology and Child Development: Research and Treatment. New York: Plenum Press, 1976. 
Michael Rutter; Eric Schopler. (editors). Autism: A reappraisal of concepts and treatment. New York: Plenum Press, 1978. .
Eric Schopler; Gary B. Mesibov. Psychoeducational Profile - Revised (PEP-R). Pro-Ed; 1 January 1979. .
Eric Schopler; Robert J. Reichler; Margaret D. Lansing. Individualized Assessment and Treatment for Autistic and Developmentally Disabled Children. University Park Press, 1980.
Eric Schopler; Robert Reichler; Margaret D. Lansing. Teaching Strategies for Parents and Professionals: Volume II. 1980.
Eric Schopler; Margaret D. Lansing; Leslie Waters. Teaching Activities for Autistic Children: Volume III. Part of the series Individualized Assessment and Treatment for Autistic and Developmentally Disabled Children. University Park Press, 1982. 
Eric Schopler; Gary B. Mesibov. Autism in Adolescents and Adults. Springer; 28 February 1983. .
Eric Schopler; Gary B. Mesibov. (editors) Communication Problems in Autism. Springer; 31 May 1985 .
Eric Schopler; Gary B. Mesibov. Social Behavior in Autism. Springer; 28 February 1986. .
Eric Schopler; Robert J. Reichler; Barbara Rochen Renner. The childhood autism rating scale (CARS) for diagnostic screening and classification of autism. New York: Irvington, 1986. 
Eric Schopler; Gary B. Mesibov. Neurobiological Issues in Autism. Springer; 30 April 1987. .
Gary Mesibov; Eric Schopler. Adolescent and Adult Psychoeducational Profile (AAPEP). Pro-Ed; 1 September 1988. .
Eric Schopler; Gary B. Mesibov. Diagnosis and Assessment in Autism. Springer; 30 September 1988. .
Gary B. Mesibov; Eric Schopler; Bruce Schaffer; Rhonda Landrus. Adolescent and Adult Psychoeducational Profile (AAPEP): Volume IV (1988). Pro-ed, 1989. .
Linda R. Watson; Catherine Lord; Bruce Schaffer; Eric Schopler. Teaching Spontaneous Communication to Autistic and Developmentally Handicapped Children. 'New York: Irvington Publishers Inc., 1988. '
Eric Schopler; Mary Elizabeth Van Bourgondien; Marie M. Bristol. (editors). Preschool Issues in Autism. New York: Plenum Press, 1993. Part of the series Current Issues in Autism. 
Eric Schopler; Gary B. Mesibov. Behavioral Issues in Autism. Springer; 31 March 1994 .
Eric Schopler; Gary B. Mesibov. Learning and cognition in autism. Plenum Press; 1995. .
Eric Schopler; Gary B. Mesibov. (editors). Parent Survival Manual: A Guide to Crisis Resolution in Autism and Related Developmental Disorders. Springer; 30 June 1995 .
Eric Schopler; Gary B. Mesibov; Linda J. Kunce.  Asperger Syndrome or High-Functioning Autism?. Springer; 30 April 1998 .
Eric Schopler; Nurit Yimiya; Cory Shulman; Lee M. Marcus (editors). The Research Basis for Autism Intervention. Plenum Publishing, 2001. 
Gary B. Mesibov; Victoria Shea; Eric Schopler. The TEACCH Approach to Autism Spectrum Disorders. Springer; 7 December 2004. .

References

External links
A blog about Eric Schopler.
The TEACCH website.

1927 births
2006 deaths
20th-century American psychologists
Autism researchers
Deaths from cancer in North Carolina
Jewish emigrants from Nazi Germany to the United States
People from Fürth
Scientists from Rochester, New York
University of Chicago School of Social Service Administration alumni
People from Mebane, North Carolina